The Mühlkreis Autobahn (A7) is an Autobahn (motorway) in the Austrian state of Upper Austria. It runs  from the West Autobahn and the city of Linz to the Mühlviertel in the north, where it ends near the small municipality of Unterweitersdorf.

Construction started in the early 1960s, however the plans of a motorway connecting Linz with České Budějovice in Czechoslovakia were never carried out and in 1982 the extension finally discontinued. Due to the increasing traffic volume after the fall of the Iron Curtain, a continuation will be provided by the Mühlviertler Schnellstraße expressway to Leopoldschlag at the Czech border, which was expected to open in 2015, but as of 2022, nothing has come of it.

See also
Autobahns of Austria

Autobahns in Austria